Mary Taylor Christian (August 9, 1924 – November 11, 2019) was an American educator and politician.

Christian was born in Hampton, Virginia and graduated from Phenix High School in Hampton in 1941. She received her bachelor's degree in education in 1955 from Hampton University, and her master's degree in speech and drama from Columbia University in 1960. Christian then received her doctorate degree from Michigan State University in 1968.  Mary T. Christian and her story can be found in the book Hampton University. She started off as a young employee of the laundry department at the school; Christian then moved on to be a typist at the same school.  Later she turned to education and became a teacher, this was encouraged by the people around her.  She could be seen on campus throughout the years because she not only worked there before she became a teacher, but she also went on to study there as well as a becoming a professor at Hampton University.

Education and community
During Christian’s time as an educator she wrote multiple papers and dissertations about educational approaches.  Her dissertation, “A Study of the Dimensions of the Nongraded School concepts” has been referenced in articles about educational practices.  Christian was also active giving speeches and sessions through the Association for the Study of Negro Life and History.  In 1970, her session was on teaching the Black experience with literature in schools.  She was actively involved in many avenues as an educator and bringing awareness to Black experiences.  Including being a professor and the Dean of Education at Hampton University in 1980.  She was lovingly called ‘Dr. C’ by her many students.  Christian was a Hampton City School Board member, becoming the first African American woman to do so.

Political career
She served in the Virginia House of Delegates, from 1986 to 2003, and was a Democrat.  She was also actively involved in politics throughout Hampton, Virginia.  Before becoming a delegate, herself, in 1968 Christian organized a voter registration drive.  More than a thousand people were able to register with Christian’s help.  She then worked as a campaign manager for many politicians in Virginia.  In 1986, Christian was elected to the Virginia House of Delegates; she was the first African American woman to become a delegate since Reconstruction. Through her time as a Virginia delegate, she established herself as a qualified delegate, receiving honors for her service in politics and activism.

In 2015, Christian was interviewed, among others, to reflect on the Voting Rights Act.  Christian witnessed the turbulence created by the Voting Rights Act in Virginia in the 1960s. She reflected on helping nursing home residents in Hampton register for voting.  Many feeling anxious because of past accounts, including the difficulties that some individuals had when it came to paying the poll tax. Mary T. Christian worked with the younger generation as well, explaining that African Americans, prior to the 1965 Voting Rights Act, faced voter suppression through things such as guessing games in order to vote.  She felt that each generation needed guidance and help the next one as well.  Her activism reached many people throughout many years. Outside of Christian’s political and educational activism, she was a member of countless boards and committees.  She was involved in the Virginia Legislative Black Caucus as the Chair, Junior League of Hampton Roads, Hampton City School Board, was the past president of the Peninsula Association for Sickle Cell Anemia, American Association of University Women, Council member of NAACP (Virginia), as well as many more.  She was also the Co – director of the Barrett - Peake Heritage Foundation.  She had a performing arts auditorium named after her; this was a result of the relationship and influence she had on the Thomas Nelson Community College.  Christian was active in her church, First Baptist Church, in Hampton, Virginia.  There was not a place that she went where she did not leave an impact.

Legacy
Mary Christian died on November 11, 2019. After her death in 2019, Christian was recognized and mourned by many people across Virginia and the United States.  Virginia delegates, representatives and other politicians spoke about her willingness to fight for change, justice and equality.  Through her service on committees, such as the Education Committee, the House Appropriation and more, she continuously fought for education, people of color and healthcare.  She was known for her service both through her activism, but also personally helping those that needed it.  Many different people in different positions, from all over the country look up to Mary T. Christian, her work and the impact she left behind her.

References 

1924 births
2019 deaths
Politicians from Hampton, Virginia
Columbia University alumni
Michigan State University alumni
Hampton University alumni
Hampton University faculty
Women state legislators in Virginia
School board members in Virginia
Democratic Party members of the Virginia House of Delegates
American women academics
21st-century American women